Bracisepalum is a genus of flowering plants from the orchid family, Orchidaceae. At the present time (May 2014), two species are known, both endemic to the Island of Sulawesi in Indonesia:

Bracisepalum densiflorum de Vogel, Blumea 28: 417 (1983)
Bracisepalum selebicum J.J.Sm., Bot. Jahrb. Syst. 65: 465 (1933)

See also 
 List of Orchidaceae genera

References 

 Pridgeon, A.M., Cribb, P.J., Chase, M.A. & Rasmussen, F. eds. (1999). Genera Orchidacearum 1. Oxford Univ. Press.
 Pridgeon, A.M., Cribb, P.J., Chase, M.A. & Rasmussen, F. eds. (2001). Genera Orchidacearum 2. Oxford Univ. Press.
 Pridgeon, A.M., Cribb, P.J., Chase, M.A. & Rasmussen, F. eds. (2003). Genera Orchidacearum 3. Oxford Univ. Press
 Berg Pana, H. 2005. Handbuch der Orchideen-Namen. Dictionary of Orchid Names. Dizionario dei nomi delle orchidee. Ulmer, Stuttgart

External links 

Orchids of Indonesia
Endemic flora of Sulawesi
Arethuseae genera
Coelogyninae